Panther is an unincorporated community in McDowell County, West Virginia, United States. Panther has a post office with ZIP code 24872.

The community was named after nearby Panther Creek.

The village is on the Norfolk Southern Railway(former Norfolk and Western) network.

References

Unincorporated communities in McDowell County, West Virginia
Unincorporated communities in West Virginia
Coal towns in West Virginia